Kikla   is a town of approximately 10,000 inhabitants in Libya, most of whom are Berber (Amazigh) descent, and is approximately 150 kilometres south-west of the country's capital, Tripoli. It was also a battleground during the 2011 Nafusa Mountains Campaign of the Libyan Civil War. Kikla is also home to three older cities: Sidi Omer, Zawit Abu Madi and Ijhish. Other towns within Kikla are Likhzour, Takbal, Awlad Issa, Awlad Omran, Mzaida, Awlad Boziry, Awlad Saeed, Awlad Sidi Omar and Amzir, the later in Berber languages(Tamazight) means waterfall. On 14 June 2011 Kikla was recaptured by the rebels.

See also
 List of cities in Libya

References

External links
 A photogallery showing the city

Populated places in Jabal al Gharbi District
Baladiyat of Libya